Sturgeon Weir 205 is an Indian reserve of the Peter Ballantyne Cree Nation in Saskatchewan. It is adjacent to the east side of Sturgeon Weir 184F.

References

Indian reserves in Saskatchewan
Peter Ballantyne Cree Nation